A ridable miniature railway (US: riding railroad or grand scale railroad) is a large scale, usually ground-level railway that hauls passengers using locomotives that are often models of full-sized railway locomotives (powered by diesel or petrol engines, live steam or electric motors).

Overview

Flat cars are arranged with foot boards so that driver and passengers sit astride the track.

The smaller gauges of miniature railway track can also be portable and is generally / gauge on raised track or as / on ground level. Typically portable track is used to carry passengers at temporary events such as fêtes and summer fairs.

Typically miniature lines are operated by not for profit organisations - often model engineering societies - though some are entirely in private grounds and others operate commercially.

There are many national organisations representing and providing guidance on miniature railway operations including the Australian Association of Live Steamers and Southern Federation of Model Engineering Societies.

Distinctions between model, miniature, and minimum-gauge railway

A 'model railway' is one where the gauge is too small for people to ride on the trains. Due to the use of mixed gauge tracks, passengers may ride on a miniature railway which shares the same gauge as, and is pulled by, a large model locomotive on a smaller model gauge, although this is rare.

'Miniature railways' are railways that can be ridden by people and are used for pleasure/as a pastime for their constructors and passengers. In the USA, miniature railways are also known as 'riding railroads' or 'grand scale railroads'.

A 'minimum-gauge railway', which generally starts at  gauge, is one that was originally conceived as a commercial railway with small gauge track, with a working function as an estate railway, an industrial railway, or a provider of public transport links, such as the Romney, Hythe and Dymchurch Railway, Fairbourne Railway or the Ravenglass and Eskdale Railway.

In the UK, a gauge of  [or above] or crossing a carriageway are the criteria used by the Office of Rail and Road (ORR), at which a railway is no longer classed as miniature and is therefore subject to formal regulation: they may be minor railways and/or heritage railways; the concept of minimum gauge is not recognised for the purposes of regulation.

Gauge
There are over 1,000 miniature railways open to the public around the world, not counting private railways, with  gauge being by far the most numerous. Many layouts have dual-gauge track combing two, three or even more different gauges.

Miniature railways

Gallery

Fifteen-inch railways

Minimum-gauge railways

Large amusement railways

See also

Backyard railroad
 British narrow-gauge railways
Children's railway
 Decauville
 Rail transport modelling scales
Train ride

References

Bibliography

External links

Grand Scales Quarterly, the US magazine of grand scale railroading
Miniature Railway World
Live Steam Tracks
Britains Great Little Railways
There and Back Light Railway
City of Oxford Society of Model Engineers
7¼ Inch Gauge Society
Model Engineering Association of New Zealand

Backyard railways
Miniature, ridable railway
S.M.P.D. Brno - Olympia